Frédéric Bourdillon (born March 16, 1991) is a French-Israeli professional basketball player who plays for Hapoel Holon in the Israel Basketball Premier League.

Early life
Bourdillon is Jewish, and was born in Grasse, France.

Bourdillon grew up playing with INSEP, a French training institute for excellence in sports. The school had been previously attended by several promising NBA players such as Tony Parker, Boris Diaw, and Ronny Turiaf. During his time with INSEP, he participated in Nike International Junior Tournaments in 2010.

Professional career

France (2009–2017)
In 2009, Bourdillon started his professional career in Olympique Antibes.

In 2010, Bourdillon signed with Élan Chalon for the 2010-11 season. Bourdillon won the 2011 French Cup title with Chalon. In 2013-14, he played for Rueil Athletic Club in the French NM1, and averaged 10.7 points and 1.8 steals per game, while shooting 82.4% from the free throw line.

On August 4, 2014, Bourdillon returned for a second stint in Antibes, signing a one-year deal. On July 14, 2015, Bourdillon signed a two-year contract extension with Antibes.

Israel (2017–present)
On September 4, 2017, Bourdillon signed with the Israeli team Maccabi Haifa for the 2017–18 season. However, on February 4, 2018, Bourdillon was released by Haifa after appearing in 14 games. On February 12, 2018, Bourdillon signed with Hapoel Eilat for the rest of the season. That season, Bourdillon helped Eilat reach the 2018 Israeli League Playoffs, where they eventually lost to Hapoel Holon in the Quarterfinals.

On June 28, 2018, Bourdillon signed a one-year contract extension with Eilat. On April 29, 2019, Bourdillon recorded a career-high 21 points, shooting 4-of-9 from three-point range, along with three rebounds and three steals in an 89–77 win over Ironi Nes Ziona. Bourdillon helped Eilat reach the 2019 Israeli League Final Four, where they eventually lost to Maccabi Tel Aviv in the Semifinals.

On October 18, 2019, Bourdillon joined Maccabi Rishon LeZion, signing a two-month deal with an option to extend it for the rest of the season.

On October 29, 2020, he signed with Hapoel Holon.

International career
Bourdillon was a member of the French Under-16 and Under-18 national teams. He also participated at the 2015 Summer Universiade.

References

External links
 RealGM profile

1991 births
Living people
Élan Chalon players
French emigrants to Israel
French expatriate basketball people
French expatriate sportspeople in Israel
French men's basketball players
French people of Jewish descent
Hapoel Eilat basketball players
Hapoel Holon players
Israeli men's basketball players
Jewish French sportspeople
Jewish men's basketball players
Maccabi Haifa B.C. players
Maccabi Rishon LeZion basketball players
Olympique Antibes basketball players
People from Grasse
Shooting guards
Sportspeople from Alpes-Maritimes